Korana is a river in central Croatia and west Bosnia and Herzegovina

Korana may also refer to:

Korana language, a South African language
Korana people or !Ora people, a Europeanised pronunciation of !Orana, a subgroup of South Africa's native people

See also 
Koranna (disambiguation)